Georg Ulrich Wasmuth (19 March 1788 – 16 October 1814) was a Norwegian military officer and who served as a representative at the Norwegian Constitutional Assembly.

Biography
Georg Ulrich Wasmuth was born at Kvernes in Kristiansund, Møre og Romsdal, Norway. Georg Ulrich underwent training at the military academy. He starting his military career as a corporal in the Nordafjelske Ski Battalion about 1804. From 1805, he was an officer in the First Trondhjemske Regiment and was promoted to Second Lieutenant in 1806 and First Lieutenant in 1808. He served in the campaign in Jämtland during the war with Sweden in 1808.  In Autumn 1814, he participated in the war with Sweden and took part in engagements in Trøndelag and at Glomma.

He represented the First Trondhjemske Regiment at the Norwegian Constituent Assembly in 1814, together with Daniel Larsen Schevig. At Eidsvoll, he supported the position of the independence party (Selvstendighetspartiet).

He married Mette Jacobine Christine Hirsch (1791-1878) in 1812. The couple resided at Værnes in Stjørdal, Nord-Trøndelag and were the parents of two children.  Georg Ulrich died shortly after the birth of their youngest child. His widow subsequently remarried.

See also
Dano-Swedish War of 1808–09
Swedish–Norwegian War (1814)

References

External links
Representantene på Eidsvoll 1814 (Cappelen Damm AS)
 Men of Eidsvoll (eidsvollsmenn)

Related Reading
Holme Jørn (2014) De kom fra alle kanter - Eidsvollsmennene og deres hus  (Oslo: Cappelen Damm) 

1788 births
1814 deaths
People from Kristiansund
Norwegian Army personnel
Norwegian military personnel of the Napoleonic Wars
Fathers of the Constitution of Norway